Myanmar Diaries, is a 2022 Burmese-Dutch-Norwegian documentary film documenting the aftermath of the 2021 Myanmar coup d'état, which led to nationwide nationwide protests, a brutal crackdown, and resulted in the ongoing Myanmar civil war. The film is a series of short films directed by the Myanmar Film Collective, an anonymous group of young Burmese filmmakers.

Critical reception 
The film was well received by audiences, and won the Berlinale Documentary Award, Bronze Panoroma Audience Award and Amnesty Film Award at the 72nd Berlin International Film Festival. It was also shown at other film festivals, including the 27th Busan International Film Festival. The film was shortlisted as one of three submissions made by the Netherlands to compete for Best Documentary Film at the 95th Academy Awards. Myanmar Diaries was awarded the inaugural Tony Elliott Impact Award at the annual Human Rights Watch Film Festival.

References

See also 

 2021 Myanmar coup d'état
 Myanmar protests (2021–present)
 Myanmar civil war (2021–present)

External links 

 
 

2020s Burmese-language films
Burmese documentary films
Films shot in Myanmar

2022 documentary films